Indian National Space Promotion and Authorization Centre (IN–SPACe) is a single-window autonomous agency under the Department of Space of the Government of India.

Space programme in India has been developed over a period of more than five decades with a strong focus on application driven programmes and bringing space to the services of the common man. In the process, it has become one of the six largest space agencies in the world. ISRO maintains one of the largest fleets of GEO communication and LEO remote sensing satellites, that cater to the ever-growing demand for fast and reliable communication and earth observation respectively.

All these years ISRO has developed several industries and Micro, Small and Medium Enterprises (MSMEs) as a supply chain partners in realization of launch vehicles and satellites. In view of the growing space sector business across the globe and to harness the huge untapped potential that exists in the country in terms of human resources, technical acumen, capabilities established in the industries in space sector, it is found prudent to enable NGEs to carry out independent space activities.

In order to achieve this objective, the Union Cabinet led by the Prime Minister Narendra Modi took the historic decision in June 2020 to open up the Space sector and enable the participation of Indian private sector in the entire gamut of space activities. To facilitate private sector participation, the government has created the Indian National Space Promotion and Authorisation Centre (IN-SPACe), as a single-window, independent, nodal agency which functions as an autonomous agency in Department of Space (DOS). Established as a single window agency for all space sector activities of private entities, IN-SPACe plays an important role in boosting the private space sector economy in India.

IN-SPACe, is responsible to promote, enable authorize and supervise various space activities of the NGEs that include, among others, the building of launch vehicles & satellites and providing space-based services; sharing of space infrastructure and premises under the control of DOS/ISRO; and establishment of new space infrastructure and facilities.

Three Directorates viz., Promotion Directorate (PD), Technical Directorate (TD) and Program Management and Authorization Directorate (PMAD) are carrying out the functions of IN-SPACe.

History 
The establishment of IN–SPACe was announced in June 2020 by the Minister of State for Space Jitendra Singh, with the Union Cabinet approving its creation. In the same month Secretary (Space) and chairperson of the Indian Space Research Organisation, Kailasavadivoo Sivan, said that it would take up to sixmonths to operationalise IN–SPACe, with the Department of Space handling its functions in the meantime.

Functions 
IN–SPACe will act as a link between the Indian Space Research Organisation (ISRO) and private sector companies, assessing "how best to utilise India’s space resources and increase space-based activities." The centre will evaluate demands of private sector companies—including educational institutes—and will find ways to attune their demands, in consultation with ISRO. Sivan told that the centre's decisions would be binding on both ISRO and private sector organisations. The space sector was earlier regulated by ISRO, but, now the organisation will focus on its core activity of research and development.

Organisation 
According to Secretary (Space) and chairperson of ISRO, Kailasavadivoo Sivan, IN–SPACe is an autonomous body with its own board—with some members from the private sector and industry —and chairperson. Dr. Pawan Kumar Goenka, is the Chairman of IN-SPACe. The centre have three directorates namely Promotion, technical and Program Management and Authorisation.

References 

 

2020 establishments in India
Space programme of India
Space agencies
Government agencies of India
Government agencies established in 2020